The Mestre Mateo Awards, known in Galician as Premios Mestre Mateo, are the main film awards in Galicia, celebrated annually. The awards were established in 2002 by the Galician Academy of Audiovisual as a continuation and expansion of the Chano Piñeiro Awards (Premios Chano Piñeiro), originally established in 2002.

The trophy is inspired by the Master Mateo's Santo dos Croques, a sculpture of the Santiago de Compostela Cathedral.

Past ceremonies 
The following is a listing of all Mestre Mateo Awards ceremonies.

References

External links 
 Galician Academy of Audiovisual 

Awards established in 2002
Galician cinema
Galician awards
Recurring events established in 2002
Annual events in Galicia (Spain)
Spanish film awards
Spanish television awards